The canton of Ligny-en-Barrois is an administrative division of the Meuse department, northeastern France. Its borders were modified at the French canton reorganisation which came into effect in March 2015. Its seat is in Ligny-en-Barrois.

It consists of the following communes:
 
Abainville
Amanty
Badonvilliers-Gérauvilliers
Biencourt-sur-Orge
Bonnet
Le Bouchon-sur-Saulx
Brauvilliers
Bure
Chanteraine
Chassey-Beaupré
Couvertpuis
Dainville-Bertheléville
Dammarie-sur-Saulx
Delouze-Rosières
Demange-Baudignécourt
Fouchères-aux-Bois
Givrauval
Gondrecourt-le-Château
Hévilliers
Horville-en-Ornois
Houdelaincourt
Ligny-en-Barrois
Longeaux
Mandres-en-Barrois
Mauvages
Menaucourt
Ménil-sur-Saulx
Montiers-sur-Saulx
Morley
Naix-aux-Forges
Nantois
Ribeaucourt
Les Roises
Saint-Amand-sur-Ornain
Saint-Joire
Tréveray
Vaudeville-le-Haut
Villers-le-Sec
Vouthon-Bas
Vouthon-Haut

References

Cantons of Meuse (department)